Bidgol (also Romanized as Bīdgol and Bīd Gol; also known as Bēdgūl and Bīdgol-e Soflá) is a village in Haft Ashiyan Rural District, Kuzaran District, Kermanshah County, Kermanshah Province, Iran. At the 2006 census, its population was 153, in 30 families.

References 

Populated places in Kermanshah County